"Edging" (stylized as EDGING) is a song recorded by American rock band Blink-182. Released on October 14, 2022, through Columbia Records, it is the band's first release since the return of founding guitarist/vocalist Tom DeLonge after a seven-year hiatus. It was written by DeLonge, bassist Mark Hoppus and drummer Travis Barker, the latter of whom also produced the song.

Background
On producing the song, Barker offered: "I wanted to imagine as a listener what I wanted to experience and at the same time as a band member what we wanted to make and say and most importantly how it would sound production wise in 2022."<ref name="Brodsky 2022"/ Though the song's title refers to the sexual practice, the song's lyrics do not directly reference it.

The band first announced the song with a promotional video announcing their reunion with DeLonge on October 11, with further clips shared on TikTok.

Composition
The song has been cited as being a pop-punk  and punk rock song by critics.

Music video
The song's music video was directed by Cole Bennett, and produced through his Lyrical Lemonade studio. In the clip, the band is seen playing the song in a run down carnival surrounded by people in rabbit costumes, who they then proceed to murder with throwing knives. Lyrical Lemondade released an alternate version of the video, featuring cameo appearances by Bennett himself and rapper Lil Tracy on October 19, 2022.

Commercial performance
In the United States, "Edging" became the band's highest-charting single on the all-genre Hot 100 in eighteen years, posting at number 61. It also made its debut at number twelve on Billboard Alternative Airplay after just three days of tracking. It then went on to become the band's fourth and longest number one single in its history, spending 13 weeks on top of Alternative Airplay, where it also gave blink-182 a top placement single in four different decades, tying them with Green Day and Red Hot Chili Peppers for the most ever by an artist. In addition, "Edging" became their biggest hit on Billboard Mainstream Rock Airplay, peaking at number two. The song also charted well outside the United States, including Canada, the UK, New Zealand, Australia, and Japan.

Reception
The song received positive reviews from contemporary music critics. Jason Lipshutz at Billboard opined that the track "proves that DeLonge, Mark Hoppus and Travis Barker still know how to get in a room and create tight, catchy, exceedingly sophomoric pop-punk; it’s great to have them back." Stereogum columnist Rachel Brodsky called the tune "fun, flippant, and satisfying as hell." Lars Brandle from Billboard called it "straight-up Blink-182 material, hewn from misspent youth and with all the bluster, swagger and stop-on-a-dime detail that made the threesome one of the most popular alternative rock acts of its era." Ellie Robinson from NME dubbed the "belting pop-punk anthem" an ode to the "dissolution of a relationship". Sam Roche from Guitar World characterized the tune as a "mid-tempo bouncy number loaded with Blink's tried-and-tested stylistic devices, including punchy powerchords, a stellar drum performance and a light-hearted tongue-in-cheek set of lyrics." Jon Caramanica of The New York Times considered it sterile, writing, "It's familiar but uncanny, Botoxed tight but with none of the puerile joy that marked the group’s breakout hits."

Personnel

Blink-182
Tom DeLonge – vocals, guitars, songwriting
Mark Hoppus – vocals, bass guitar, songwriting
Travis Barker – drums, percussion, producer, songwriting

Other musicians
Kevin Bivona – keyboards

Production
Şerban Ghenea – mixing
Dan Book – engineer, songwriting 
Aaron Rubin – recording engineer
Kevin Gruft – recording engineer
Nicholas Morzov – recording engineer
Bryce Bordone – additional engineering
Randy Merrill – mastering engineer
Nick Long – songwriting

Charts

References

2022 singles
2022 songs
Blink-182 songs
Songs written by Mark Hoppus
Songs written by Tom DeLonge
Songs written by Travis Barker